Apallaga rutilans, commonly known as the large sprite, is a species of butterfly in the family Hesperiidae. It is found in Guinea, Sierra Leone, Ivory Coast, Ghana, Nigeria (the Cross River loop), Cameroon, Bioko, Gabon, the Republic of the Congo, the Central African Republic and the Democratic Republic of the Congo. The habitat consists of forests.

References

Butterflies described in 1877
Hesperiidae
Butterflies of Africa
Taxa named by Paul Mabille